Amoria simoneae is a species of sea snail, a marine gastropod mollusk in the family Volutidae, the volutes.

Description

Distribution
This marine species occurs off Northwest Australia.

References

 Bail P. & Limpus A. (2003 ["2002"]) Two new species of Volutidae (Gastropoda) from Western Australia, Notovoluta norwestralis n. sp. and Amoria (Amoria) simoneae n. sp. La Conchiglia 34(305): 23–30

Volutidae
Gastropods described in 2003